The Art Hauser Centre (formerly the Communiplex) is a multi-purpose arena in Prince Albert, Saskatchewan, Canada. It was built in 1971 and is home to the Prince Albert Raiders Ice hockey team in the Western Hockey League. Its hockey capacity is 2,580 seated, plus another 786 spots that are standing-room only.

The Art Hauser Centre was formerly known as the Prince Albert Communiplex, but it was renamed late in the 2004-2005 hockey season as part of the "Bring Back The Magic" campaign. This was an endeavour to raise money for extensive renovations to the Communiplex. In just under a month, the campaign raised over $3 million.

The arena was named in honour of local businessperson Art Hauser, who made a donation of $1 million to the campaign. Renovations were completed in the spring of 2006.

Changes to the arena included new concessions at the southeast corner of the building on both levels, new washrooms at the southeast corner of the building on both levels, new seats in the entire arena, renovated dressing rooms, a new centre-ice scoreboard with video boards on all 4 sides, an expanded Ches Leach Lounge, a new front lobby named for Prince Albert-born former NHL goalie Johnny Bower with concessions and team store, and new offices for both the WHL Raiders and the City of Prince Albert.

References

External links
Official web site
Official City of Prince Albert Press Release & History
Prince Albert Raiders Press Release
WHL Press Release
Art Hauser Centre on ArenaMaps.com

Indoor arenas in Saskatchewan
Indoor ice hockey venues in Canada
Sports venues in Saskatchewan
Western Hockey League arenas
Buildings and structures in Prince Albert, Saskatchewan
Music venues in Saskatchewan
Sport in Prince Albert, Saskatchewan
Tourist attractions in Prince Albert, Saskatchewan